The 2015–16 Boston University Terriers men's basketball team represented Boston University during the 2015–16 NCAA Division I men's basketball season. The Terriers, led by fifth year head coach Joe Jones, played their home games at Case Gym and were members of the Patriot League. They finished the season 19–15, 11–7 in Patriot League play to finish in third place. They lost in the quarterfinals of the Patriot League tournament to American. They were invited to the CollegeInsider.com Tournament where they defeated Fordham in the first round before losing in the second round to NJIT.

Previous season
The Terriers finished the season 13–17, 9–9 in Patriot League play to finish in a tie for fourth place. They lost in the quarterfinals of the Patriot League tournament to Lafayette.

Departures

Incoming recruits

2016 class recruits

Roster

Schedule

|-
!colspan=9 style="background:#CC0000; color:#FFFFFF;"| Non-conference regular season

|-
!colspan=9 style="background:#CC0000; color:#FFFFFF;"| Patriot League regular season

|-
!colspan=9 style="background:#CC0000; color:#FFFFFF;"| Patriot League tournament

|-
!colspan=9 style="background:#CC0000; color:#FFFFFF;"| CIT

References

Boston University Terriers men's basketball seasons
Boston University
Boston University
Boston
Boston